Harshita (Hindi : हर्षिता) is a Hindu/Sanskrit Indian feminine given name, which means "full of happiness". The name is traditionally associated with pureness of heart and soul, and honesty. Notable people with the name include:   

 Harshita Gaur (born 1990), Indian actress
 Harshita Ojha, Indian actress
 Harshita Saxena, pageant contestant
 Harshita Tomar (born 2002), Indian sailor

See also 

 Harshit
 Harshitha

Hindu given names
Indian feminine given names